John Rolfe Gardiner (born 1936) is an American author of several novels and short stories.

Life and career
He is best known for his novel Somewhere in France (1999), aside from which he has written four other novels and two short-story collections. Sixteen of his stories were published in The New Yorker; others were published in The American Scholar and in other publications. His short story "The Voyage Out" was anthologized in The Best American Short Stories. His work was awarded the Lila Wallace Reader's Digest Writers Award and the O. Henry Award.

Gardiner's stories often take place in his native Virginia, but also in various places in Europe, most prominently in France. His work has received vast critical acclaim:

Gardiner lives in Middleburg, Virginia, with his artist wife Joan. They have one daughter, Nicola.

Bibliography

Novels
Great Dream From Heaven (1974)
Unknown Soldiers (1977)
In The Heart Of The Whole World (1988)
Somewhere In France (1999)
Double Stitch (2003)

Short story collections
Going On Like This (1983)
The Incubator Ballroom (1991)
The Magellan House (2004)

References

1936 births
Living people
American male novelists
Novelists from Virginia
American male short story writers
20th-century American novelists
20th-century American short story writers
21st-century American novelists
21st-century American short story writers
20th-century American male writers
21st-century American male writers
People from Middleburg, Virginia